Cryptoriana – The Seductiveness of Decay is the twelfth studio album by English extreme metal band Cradle of Filth. It was released on 22 September 2017 through Nuclear Blast Records. It is the second and final album to feature Lindsay Schoolcraft on narration before her departure in February 2020.

Background and promotion 
Dani Filth said the album "is deeply infused with Victorian gothic horror and thus the title is a reflection of that. 'Cryptoriana' implies the Victorians' infatuation with the supernatural, the grave and the ghoulish. And the subtitle, 'The Seductiveness of Decay', further cements this attraction to death and the glittering lengthy process of self-annihilation".

The first promotional single, "Heartbreak and Seance", premiered alongside an accompanying music video on 11 July 2017.

The second single, "You Will Know the Lion by His Claw", premiered together with a lyric music video on 8 August 2017.

The third single, "Achingly Beautiful", was also released in conjunction with a lyric video on 15 September. Vocalist Dani Filth stated the single "has a very old-school Cradle vibe" and compared it to the song "A Gothic Romance" from the album Dusk and Her Embrace.

Track listing

Personnel
All information from the album booklet.

Cradle of Filth
Dani Filth – lead vocals, lyrics
Martin 'Marthus' Škaroupka – drums, keyboards, orchestration, choir vocals, score arrangements, choir and soprano arrangements
Daniel Firth – bass
Lindsay Schoolcraft – narration
Richard Shaw – guitar
Marek 'Ashok' Šmerda – guitar

Additional musicians
Liv Kristine – vocals on "Vengeful Spirit"
Linda Nepivodova – choir and alto vocals
Lucie Korinkova – choir, alto and soprano vocals
Petr Janovsky – choir and bass vocals
Vit Starka – choir and bass vocals
Miloš Makovský – choir vocals
Martin Franze – choir and baritone vocals, artistic leader
Dana Toncrová – choir and soprano vocals
Ivan Nepivoda – choir and tenor vocals
Jakub Herzan – choir and tenor vocals

Production
Chris Schäfer – engineering
Arthur Berzinsh – artwork
Scott Atkins – producer, engineering, mixing, mastering
Roman Jez – engineering
Igor Mores – engineering
Flame Hel – photography
Dan Goldsworthy – layout

Charts

References

Cradle of Filth albums
2017 albums
Nuclear Blast albums